Hulunbuir Hailar Airport  is an international airport serving Hailar District of Hulunbuir, a prefecture-level city of Inner Mongolia, China.  The airport was formerly called Hailar Dongshan Airport until it was renamed on 1 January 2011.

Airlines and destinations

See also
List of airports in China
List of the busiest airports in China

References

Airports in Inner Mongolia
Hulunbuir
Airports established in 1989